The Malabon Zoo, Aquarium and Botanical Garden, commonly known as Malabon Zoo, is a zoo situated in Malabon, Metro Manila, Philippines.

History
The Malabon Zoo first opened around 1989 and was founded by the Manny Tangco in Barangay Potrero in Malabon, Metro Manila. In March 2020, community quarantine measures imposed as a response to the COVID-19 pandemic forced the closure of the zoo to the public and caused financial strain to the zoo's maintenance. This led Tangco launching an appeal for donations so he could still feed the zoo's animals, which was responded by various private and public personalities. The zoo has since reopened on November 7, 2021.

Animals

Malabon Zoo has developed a reputation for naming its individual animals after public figures including former and current politicians, actors and actresses, and other celebrities. Among the animals kept in captivity include Bengal tigers, lions, bears, deer, orangutans, and snakes.

References

1989 establishments in the Philippines
Zoos in Metro Manila
Buildings and structures in Malabon